Navès is a commune in the Tarn department in southern France.

Geography
The Thoré forms most of the commune's north-eastern border, then flows into the Agout, which forms part of its northern border.

Historic sites
 Château de Montespieu, restored castle, listed as a monument historique in 1992.
 Château de Navès (residence of Georges Prêtre)
 The manoir de Gaillard and its classified dovecote
 Tour de Navès, fortified 16th century tower, listed as a monument historique in 1995.
 Church of  Saint John the Baptiste

Notable people
 Georges Prêtre (1924 – 2017), orchestral and opera conductor, had a home in Navès.

See also
Communes of the Tarn department

References

Communes of Tarn (department)